The Pass Creek Snowshoe Cabin, built in 1938 in Glacier National Park, is a significant resource both architecturally and historically as a shelter, usually  apart, for patrolling backcountry rangers.

The Pass Creek shelter was originally built by trail crews on their own initiative as a more permanent and bear-proof accommodation than tents, which had been repeatedly raided.  The cabin is therefore slightly larger and taller than the Park Service-standard cabins.

References

Park buildings and structures on the National Register of Historic Places in Montana
Residential buildings completed in 1938
Log cabins in the United States
National Register of Historic Places in Glacier County, Montana
Log buildings and structures on the National Register of Historic Places in Montana
1938 establishments in Montana
National Register of Historic Places in Glacier National Park
Rustic architecture in Montana